The 2013 Open de Rennes was a professional tennis tournament played on hard courts. It was the eight edition of the tournament which was part of the 2013 ATP Challenger Tour. It took place in Rennes, France between 7 and 13 October 2013.

Singles main-draw entrants

Seeds

 1 Rankings are as of September 30, 2013.

Other entrants
The following players received wildcards into the singles main draw:
  Kenny de Schepper
  Nicolas Mahut
  Josselin Ouanna
  Guillaume Rufin

The following players used protected ranking to get into the singles main draw:
  Andreas Beck

The following players received entry from the qualifying draw:
  Kimmer Coppejans
  Constant Lestienne
  Björn Phau
  Jürgen Zopp

Champions

Singles

 Nicolas Mahut def.  Kenny de Schepper 6–3, 7–6(7–3)

Doubles

 Florin Mergea /  Oliver Marach def.  Nicholas Monroe /  Simon Stadler 6–4, 3–6, [10–7]

External links
Official Website

Open de Rennes
Open de Rennes
2013 in French tennis